Eduardo Estrada (born 12 October 1921) was a Mexican wrestler. He competed in the men's freestyle welterweight at the 1948 Summer Olympics.

References

External links
 

1921 births
Possibly living people
Mexican male sport wrestlers
Olympic wrestlers of Mexico
Wrestlers at the 1948 Summer Olympics
Place of birth missing
20th-century Mexican people